Storyteller Distribution Co., LLC, doing business as Amblin Partners, LLC., is an American entertainment production company, which succeeded the live-action counterpart of DreamWorks and is led by Steven Spielberg.  It develops and produces films under the Amblin Entertainment and DreamWorks Pictures banners, as well as television series through Amblin Television. The company's investment partners include Reliance Group's Reliance Entertainment, Hasbro's Entertainment One, Alibaba Group's Alibaba Pictures and NBCUniversal/Comcast's Universal Pictures. Films produced by Amblin Partners are primarily distributed by Universal in North America and select international territories and by third-party distributors through Mister Smith Entertainment in Europe, the Middle East and Africa.

History 
Amblin Partners, LLC. was founded by Steven Spielberg, Jeff Skoll of Participant Media, Anil Ambani of Reliance Anil Dhirubhai Ambani Group and Darren Throop of Entertainment One on December 16, 2015.  The company will primarily focus on producing and distributing films and television using the DreamWorks Pictures, Amblin Entertainment and Participant Media brands. For films, it uses the original DreamWorks label for mature content, Amblin label for family-friendly content, and Participant label for social justice content, although the latter remains a separate company.

On the same day as the company's formation, Amblin Partners, LLC. announced that it entered into a five-year distribution deal with Universal Pictures by which the films would be distributed and marketed by either the main Universal banner or its specialty label, Focus Features. The Girl on the Train was the first film released under the deal. Mister Smith Entertainment, which began its international distribution deal with DreamWorks on August 29, 2012, continues to handle distribution sales for Amblin Partners, LLC. in Europe, the Middle East and Africa.

On October 9, 2016, Amblin Partners, LLC. struck a deal with China's Alibaba Pictures, in which Alibaba acquired a minority equity stake in the company and will handle marketing, distribution support and merchandising of Amblin Partners, LLC. films in China in addition to co-financing Amblin and DreamWorks films worldwide. On February 15, 2017, Comcast's Universal acquired a minority stake in Amblin Partners, strengthening the relationship between Universal and Amblin.

On December 18, 2017, Amblin Partners, LLC. signed a music publishing deal with BMG Rights Management, covering music from its films and TV series.

On August 22, 2019, Hasbro announced that it would acquire Entertainment One for at least $4 billion. The acquisition was completed on December 30, 2019, resulting in the toy company inheriting eOne's stake in Amblin Entertainment and DreamWorks Pictures. On May 5, 2020, Amblin renewed its deal with Nordisk Film. On November 30, 2020, Amblin Partners, LLC. renewed its distribution deal with Universal, which continues to be an equity stake holder. That same month however, Participant terminated its equity stake in Amblin Partners, ending its relationship with the company.

On June 21, 2021, Amblin Partners inked a multi-year deal to produce "multiple new feature films per year" for Netflix.

Film library

Released

Upcoming

In development

References

External links 
 

 
Film production companies of the United States
Film distributors of the United States
Television production companies of the United States
Amblin Entertainment
DreamWorks Pictures
Steven Spielberg
Entertainment companies based in California
Companies based in Los Angeles County, California
Universal City, California
American companies established in 2015
Entertainment companies established in 2015
Mass media companies established in 2015
2015 establishments in California
Joint ventures
Alibaba Group
Entertainment One
Reliance Entertainment subsidiaries
Universal Pictures subsidiaries
Cinema of Southern California